Bruwer is a surname. Notable people with the surname include:

 Danzyl Bruwer (born 1976), Namibian footballer
 Driaan Bruwer (born 1995), South African cricketer
 Jacobus Albertus Bruwer (1915–), South African astronomer

See also
 Brewer (surname)
 1811 Bruwer, main-belt asteroid